Jean Pain (12 December 1928 – 30 July 1981) was a Swiss-born French inventor and innovator who developed the compost heater, a compost-based bioenergy system, that produced 100% of his energy needs. He also distilled enough methane to run an electricity generator, cooking elements, and power his truck. This method of creating usable energy from composting materials has come to be known as "Jean Pain Composting", or the "Jean Pain Method".

Personal life
Jean and his wife, Ida, lived near Domaine des Templiers, on a  timber tract near the Alpes de Provence.

Composting method
See main article compost heater.

Death
Jean Pain died from bladder cancer in 1981, aged 52.

References

External links
 Digital reproduction of 1981 Reader's Digest article
 Comite Jean Pain, Belgian organisation established to promote the methods of Jean Pain
 European bioconversion projects and realizations for macroalgal biomass: Saint-Cast-Le-Guildo (France) experiment, reference to Pain method of breaking down wood chips in relation to the composting of macroalgal biomass
 Another Kind of Energy or ComPost-Modernism, essay by Peter Bane for the Permaculture Activist
 DIY Water Heating with Compost, article in Mother Earth News (July/August 1981)
 Ida and Jean Pain Composting, article in Tribe Net (September 2007)
 A collection of articles innovating on the method, Build It Solar (magazine)
 70 page German language booklet, drachenmuehle.de

1928 births
1981 deaths
20th-century French inventors
Deaths from bladder cancer
Deaths from cancer in France
Place of birth missing
Place of death missing